SS Robert F. Burns was a Liberty ship built in the United States during World War II.

Construction
Robert F. Burns was laid down on 30 June 1945, under a Maritime Commission (MARCOM) contract, MC hull 3146, by J.A. Jones Construction, Panama City, Florida; she was launched on 28 August 1945.

History
She was allocated to United States Navigation Co.Inc., on 19 September 1945. On 25 April 1949, she was placed in the, Beaumont Reserve Fleet, Beaumont, Texas. She was sold for scrapping, 19 January 1967, to Southern Scrap Materials, for $45,188.88. She was removed from the fleet, 11 May 1967.

References

Bibliography

 
 
 
 
 
 

 

Liberty ships
Ships built in Panama City, Florida
1945 ships
Beaumont Reserve Fleet